Leota is a ghost town located in Washington County, Mississippi, United States.  The settlement, along with its river port Leota Landing, were at one time located directly on the Mississippi River.

History
Both Leota and Leota Landing were established on the Leota Plantation, founded in 1825 by Isaac Worthington.  The plantation was located a few miles north on the Mississippi River from the former county seat of Princeton.

The plantation was named by Worthington's daughter Annie, after a favorite fictional character.

Leota was a leading river port between Memphis, Tennessee and Vicksburg, Mississippi, and was a shipping point for cotton.

Leota was incorporated in 1882.

The settlement had a post office, and a population of 50 in 1900.

Little remains of the settlement, which is today covered by forest and a portion of the Mississippi River levee.

Notable people
 Wilford Horace Smith - The first black lawyer to win a case before the Supreme Court of the United States.

References

Former populated places in Washington County, Mississippi
Former populated places in Mississippi
Mississippi populated places on the Mississippi River